Atlantic Reserve Fleet, New London opened in 1946 at the Naval Submarine Base New London in Groton, Connecticut on the Thames River. The New London Reserve Fleet was 3 miles north of the city New London, Connecticut. Naval Submarine Base New London opened in 1872 as a Navy yard, gained its first submarines on 13 Oct 1915, and earned the designation of Submarine Base in about 1916. The freshwater port became a good site to store both submarines and ships after World War II as  part of the United States Navy reserve fleets.  Three submarine tender ships were given the task of mothballing the submarines. The three ships: USS Apollo, USS Anthedon, USS Proteus (AS-19) cleaned the ship and sealed the subs with preservatives. It took a few years to process  the over 50 submarines in the New London Reserve fleet. Some submarines there were reactivated for the Korean War. By 1965 the fleet of World War II submarine were obsolete and the fleet had been scrapped.

The USS Apollo worked at the Reserve fleet till 1963. The USS Proteus worked at the fleet until January 1959, then transferred to the Charleston Naval Shipyard and was converted to a Polaris Fleet Ballistic Missile submarine tender. USS Anthedon served the fleet until 1969 when she was sold to Turkey and became the Turkish Navy TCG Donatan (A-583).

Example
USS Pompon  a Gato-class submarine, was stored at the Atlantic Reserve Fleet, New London from May 1946 to 1953. In 1953 she was removed from Atlantic Reserve Fleet, New London and recommissioned as SSR-267 a radar picket submarine.
USS Tigrone (SS-419) was stored at the Atlantic Reserve Fleet, New London from 1946 to 1948. In 1948 she was removed from Atlantic Reserve Fleet, New London and recommissioned as SSR-419, a radar picket submarine.
USS Jack (SS-259)  submarine, was stored at the Atlantic Reserve Fleet, New London from 1946 to 1957. In 1957, she was transferred to the Greece.
USS Archerfish (SS-311) stored at Atlantic Reserve Fleet, New London from 1955 to 1958.

See also

Submarine Force Library and Museum
Naval Submarine Medical Research Laboratory

External links
Official website Naval Submarine Base New London

References

Atlantic Reserve Fleet, New London